Varnapakittu is a 1997 Indian Malayalam-language drama film directed by I. V. Sasi and written by Babu Janardhanan from a story by Jokuttan. The film features Mohanlal and Meena in lead roles, with Dileep, Divya Unni, Madhu, Jagadish, Rajan P. Dev, M. G. Soman in supporting roles. The movie, directed by I V Sasi, was a commercial success.

Plot

Sunny Palamattam (Mohanlal) is a successful businessman in Singapore. He enjoys a flamboyant life with girlfriend Sandra Valookaran (Meena). His business rival, Mohammad Ali (Kazan Khan), was a partner who left after he was found embezzling company funds.

Sunny discloses his past to Sandra: his family was a happy one, until Pappan (Rajan P. Dev) framed Sunny's father Ittichan (Madhu) in a fraud case. Shortly after, Ittichan died of a heart attack, and Sunny's engagement with fiancée Nancy (Divya Unni) was called off. Sunny fled to Mumbai, and then to Singapore with Kuruvilla's help.

Later, Sunny learns that Sandra is actually a call girl hired by Mohammad Ali, to spy on Sunny and foil his business plans. To fulfill his marriage commitment to his family, he and Sandra pretend they are still engaged when they go to visit Sunny's family in Kerala. In his hometown, he meets the old enemies who falsely accused his father of theft and thus ruined the family reputation.

Sunny plans to take revenge on Pappan, Tonychen (Ganesh Kumar) and company, aided by Paily (Jagadish). In the meantime, he meets Nancy who is now married to Paulachen (Dileep), Tonychen's younger brother. When Tony tries to sexually assault Nancy, Paulachan is humiliated and commits suicide.

Mohammad Ali arrives with a gang from Singapore to reveal Sunny's "false marriage" ploy in an attempt to destroy him. Sunny pleads with Mohammad Ali to forget everything so that he can live a happy life and offers all his assets to Mohammad Ali, but Mohammad Ali has a change of heart and leaves Sunny and his family alone. In the end Sunny and Sandra appear with a happy family.

Cast

Mohanlal as Sunny Palamattom
Meena as Sandra / Alina
Dileep as Pullankunnel Paulachen
Divya Unni as Nancy Paul
Madhu as Palamattom Ittichan, Sunny's Father
Jagadish as Paily, Sunny's Friend
Rajan P. Dev as Pullankunnel Pappan
K. B. Ganesh Kumar as Pullankunnel Tonychen
Janardhanan as Ramaswamy Iyer
M. G. Soman as Kuruvilla
Reena as Kuruvilla's wife
Bheeman Raghu as SI Damodaran Nair
N. F. Varghese as Father Joseph Varghese
Sadiq as Kunjoonju
Bharathi Vishnuvardhan as Sunny's Mother
Reshmi Soman as Mollykutty, Sunny's Younger Sister
Kazan Khan as Mohammed Ali
Kundara Johny as Advocate Chandrashekharan, Sunny's Advocate
Usha as Tonychen's Wife
Kanakalatha as Sunny's Elder Sister
Seetha as Sukanya, Sandra's Sister
Yavanika Gopalakrishnan as Sunny's Brother In Law
Maya as TV Reporter
Elias Babu as Kunjukochu Nancy's Father
Antony Perumbavoor as a man in store

Soundtrack 
The songs were composed by Vidyasagar. "Velli Nila" is based on "Ooohalalo Oopirilo" from Urmila (1993).

Box Office
Varnapakittu was major commercial hit in the year 1997 and was the beginning of the Mohanlal-Meena hit combo which churned out many movies including Olympian Anthony Adam,Mr Bhramachari, Natturajavu, Udayananu Tharam, Chandrotsavam, Drishyam, Munthirivallikal Thalirkkumbol, Drishyam 2 and Bro Daddy.

References

External links
 
 http://en.msidb.org/m.php?2196
 http://popcorn.oneindia.in/title/6392/varnapakittu.html

1990s Malayalam-language films
1990s romance films
1997 films
1990s action films
Indian drama films
Films set in Singapore
Films shot in Singapore
Films directed by I. V. Sasi
Films scored by Vidyasagar